Jerry Trimble is an American actor, martial artist, stuntman, youth motivational speaker and former world kickboxing champion. Trimble played Detective Schwartz in the 1995 film Heat and Jonny in the 1989 film The Master.

Career 
Trimble is a two-time World Kickboxing champion who fought under the nickname "Golden Boy".

Trimble played Jonny in the 1989 film The Master alongside Jet Li. Trimble has been in over sixty feature films and TV shows, in half of which he played lead. The list includes Green Hornet as well as Heat (playing alongside Al Pacino and Robert De Niro) and Charlie's Angels (where he was nominated for the Taurus Award in the category of best fight). He was in Mission: Impossible III where he had a one on one fight scene with Tom Cruise. Jerry stated that Tom exhibited excellent fighting skills for a non-professional fighter. Some of  Jerry's most recent work can be seen in The Butcher with Eric Roberts, TV shows Dark Blue and Eleventh Hour. He is in the American TV show Supernatural as Ramiel, Prince of Hell.

Personal life
Trimble is married to actress Ami Dolenz, daughter of The Monkees' Micky Dolenz. As of April 2015, the couple resided in Vancouver.

Filmography

Films

TV shows

References

External links
 
 

American male film actors
American male kickboxers
American male taekwondo practitioners
American expatriates in Canada
Living people
Male actors from Vancouver
People from Newport, Kentucky
Sportspeople from Vancouver
Year of birth missing (living people)
Dolenz family